The 2013 Turkish Cup Final was the 51st final of the Turkish Cup. The final was contested between Fenerbahçe and Trabzonspor. Match was played on 22 May 2013, at 20:45 local time. The venue chosen for the match was Ankara 19 Mayıs Stadium, a neutral ground for both clubs. Fenerbahçe were the winners of the match, and eventual winners of the 2012–13 Turkish Cup.

Final

See also
2012–13 Turkish Cup
2013 Turkish Super Cup

References

2013
Cup
Turkish Cup Final 2013
Turkish Cup Final 2013